Henry Berry Lowry ( – unknown after 1872) was an American outlaw. A Lumbee Native American, he led the Lowry Gang in North Carolina during and after the American Civil War. Many local North Carolinians remember him as a Robin Hood figure. Lowry was described by George Alfred Townsend, a correspondent for the New York Herald in the late 19th century, as "[o]ne of those remarkable executive spirits that arises now and then in a raw community without advantages other than those given by nature."

Early life
Lowry was born  to Allen and Mary (Cumbo) Lowry in the Hopewell Community, in Robeson County, North Carolina. His father owned a successful  mixed-use farm in the county. Henry Lowry was one of 12 children, described as multi-racial or free people of color.

Lowry Gang
The Confederate government used conscription to force many locals to work on the construction of various forts around the Cape Fear River area for very little pay. Several Lowry cousins, excluded from military service because they were free men of color, had been conscripted to help build Fort Fisher. The Lowry Gang was originally started to aid those hiding from conscription. Other residents resorted to "lying out" (hiding in the region's swamps) to avoid being rounded up by the Confederate Home Guard and forced to work for low wages. As the Civil War approached its end, the Lowry Gang aligned themselves with various Union soldiers that had escaped from Confederate prison camps and conducted guerrilla warfare against the Confederacy.

On December 21, 1864, James P. Barnes, a neighbor of Allen Lowry, accused him of stealing hogs. Lowry's son Henry killed Barnes. In January 1865, Henry Lowry also killed James Brantley Harris, a conscription officer, for allegedly mistreating the women of the Lowry family.  In March 1865, the Home Guard searched his father Allen Lowry's home and found firearms, which free people of color had been forbidden to own since after 1831 and Nat Turner's rebellion. The Home Guard convened a kangaroo court, convicted Allen Lowry and his son William, and executed them in March 1865. Henry  reportedly watched from the bushes. Thereafter, young Henry came to be regarded as the new leader of the Lowry band. Although Lowry's band was composed mostly of Native Americans, among his chief lieutenants were the black man George Applewhite and the white youth Zachariah McLaughlin. The Lowry gang committed many robberies with atypical conditions. Victims of the thefts were treated respectfully, considering the circumstances, and the victims could potentially avoid being robbed if they could show that they could not afford it. The Lowry gang often returned certain stolen items such as horses and wagons when they no longer needed them. The gang at times was known for sharing their profits with the poor, such as distributing corn to the hungry.

Lowry War

Henry Lowry led a gang in committing a series of robberies and murders against the upper class, continuing until 1872. The attempts to capture the gang members became known as the Lowry War. The Lowry gang consisted of Henry Lowry, his brothers Stephen and Thomas, two cousins (Calvin and Henderson Oxendine), two of his brothers-in-law, two escaped slaves, a white man, and two other men of unknown relation.

Lowry's gang continued its actions into Reconstruction. Republican governor William Woods Holden outlawed Lowry and his men in 1869, and offered a $12,000 reward for their capture: dead or alive. Lowry responded with more revenge killings.

On December 7, 1865, he married Rhoda Strong. Immediately after the wedding, and in the presence of several hundred wedding guests, Lowry was arrested by former members of the Confederate Home Guard turned county militia and under the charge of murdering James Barnes. He was able to escape by filing through the bars with a file that was smuggled to him by members of his gang. The governor at the time, Jonathon Worth, placed a $300 dead or alive bounty on his head, but the gang would go on to evade captivity for another 3 years despite many efforts made by the militia to apprehend him. A few notable events include fending off a search posse while using a boat for cover and eluding troops from United States military that were sent down to North Carolina specifically to capture him. In 1871 Francis Marion Wishart became colonel of the Police Guard manhunt and had the wives of the Lowry band held hostage in prison. Henry Berry Lowry and other band members sent the colonel a letter with an ultimatum, either the release of their wives of the Lowry Gang, or "the bloodiest times will be here than ever was before—the life of every man will be in jeopardy." Their wives were abruptly released.

Lowry's band opposed the postwar conservative Democratic power structure, which worked to reassert its political dominance and white supremacy. The Lowry gang robbed and killed numerous people of the establishment. Because of this, they gained the sympathy of the non-white population of Robeson County. The authorities were unable to stop the Lowry gang, largely because of this support. The conservative Democratic party was replaced by a more moderate Republican party with ideological similarities to many Lowry supporters.

In February 1872, shortly after a raid in which he robbed the local sheriff's safe of more than $28,000, Henry Berry Lowry disappeared. Colonel Wishart called the reports of his death "ALL A HOAX." The $12,000 reward for his life was never collected. It is claimed he accidentally shot himself while cleaning his double-barrel shotgun. As with many folk heroes, the death of Lowry was disputed. He was reportedly seen at a funeral several years later. Without his leadership, every member of the gang except two were subsequently captured or killed. Reverend Patrick Lowry, as a delegate to the Republican state convention in 1872, announced that his brother (Henry Berry) was in fact dead. However, Henry Berry's wife, Rhoda, insisted until her death in 1909 that he had escaped, even though she remarried a few years after his disappearance.  Henry Berry Lowry had three children: Sally Ann (b. 1867), Henry Delany (b. 1869), and Nealy-ann (b. 1870).

Depictions
Starting in 1976, Lowry's legend has been presented each summer in an outdoor drama called Strike at the Wind! in Red Banks, North Carolina. Set during the Civil War and Reconstruction years, the play portrays Lowry as a Native American culture hero who flouts the white power structure by fighting for his people and defending the county's downtrodden citizens.
Aftershock: Beyond the Civil War DVD (91 min.) A History Channel production. Dir. David W. Padrusch. Prod. Matt Koed. New York : A&E Home Video; dist. by New Video, 2007.
Indian warriors: the untold story of the Civil War. DVD (50 min.). Dir. Geoffrey Madeja. Prod. Bernard Dudek. The History Channel, 2006.
Through Native Eyes: The Henry Berry Lowrey Story (1999) is a documentary by North Carolina director Van Coleman.

Commemoration 
The Lowry family home was moved to the grounds of the North Carolina Indian Cultural Center in Pembroke. In 2007, North Carolina erected a highway historical marker along Lowry Street in Pembroke to commemorate Lowry.

References

Secondary sources

"A History of the Capture of the Notorious Outlaw George Applewhite, alias, Ranse Lowrie, of the Lowrie Gang of Outlaws, or Robeson County, N.C. .. ." Columbus, GA: Thos. Gilbert, 1872.
Barton, Garry Lewis. The Life and Times of Henry Berry Lowry. Pembroke, NC: Lumbee Publishing Co., 1979/1992.
Blu, Karen I. The Lumbee Problem: The Making of an American Indian, Lincoln: University of Nebraska Press, 2001
Cassia, Paul Sant. "Banditry, Myth, and Terror in Cyprus and Other Mediterranean Societies." Comparative Studies in Society and History 35, no. 4 (October 1993).
Dial, Adolph L. and David K. Eliades, "The Only Land I Know:" A History of the Lumbee Indians, Syracuse University Press, 1996
Evans, W. McKee. To Die Game: the Story of the Lowry Band, Indian Guerillas of Reconstruction. Baton Rouge: Louisiana State University Press, 1971.
__. "Henry Berry Lowry." In Dictionary of North Carolina Biography, ed. William S. Powell. Vol. 4. Chapel Hill: University of North Carolina Press, 1991, 104–05.
Godbold, E. Stanly Jr. and Mattie U. Russell, Confederate Colonel And Cherokee Chief: The Life Of William Holland Thomas, University of Tennessee Press, 1990
Hauptman, Lawrence M. "River Pilots and Swamp Guerrillas: Pamunkee and Lumbee Unionists." In Between Two Fires: American Indians in the Civil War. New York: Free Press, 1995, 65–85.
Hobsbawm, Eric. Bandits. New York: Delacorte Press, 1969.
Manning, Charles. "Last of Lowries Recalls Saga of Death and Terror." Greensboro Daily News, 19 January 1958, A13.
Norment, Mary C. The Lowrie History, As Acted in Part by Henry Berry Lowrie, the Great North Carolina Bandit. With Biographical Sketches of His Associates. Being a Complete History of the Modern Robber Band in the County of Robeson and State of North Carolina. Wilmington: Daily Journal Printer, 1875.
Oxendine, Kelvin R. "Direct Descendants of Henry Berry Lowrie". (December 7, 2015). Lulu Publishing.
Rockwell, Paul A. "Lumbees Rebelled Against Proposed Draft by South," Asheville Citizen-Times 2 February 1958.
Townsend, George Alfred. The Swamp Outlaws: or, The North Carolina Bandits; Being a Complete History of the Modern Rob Roys and Robin Hoods. The Red Wolf Series. New York: Robert M. DeWitt, 1872.
Wilkins, David E. "Henry Berry Lowrie: Champion of the Dispossessed." Race, Gender & Class 13.2 (Winter 1996): 97-111.

Contemporary newspapers
 "A Notorious Desperado Killed in North Carolina—A Company of Soldiers After his Confederates—A Defaulting Book-keeper in Chicago," New York Times December 18, 1870, p. 1.
"Are the Robeson County, N.C., Outlaws KuKlux?" New York Times May 16, 1871, p. 1.
"Robin Hood Come Again." New York Times 22 July 1871: p. 4, col. 5.
"The North Carolina Outlaws—Lowrey and his Gang—The Authorities Defied—Pursuit by the Soldiers." New York Times October 11, 1871, p. 11.
"A new expedition: Proposition to Capture the Lowrie Gang of Outlaws—Singular Enterprise of a Fourth Ward Character." New York Times 18 March 1872: p. 5, col. 3.
"The North Carolina Bandits." Harper's Weekly 16 (30 March 1872): pp. 249, 251–2.
"The Lowrey Outlaws: Particulars of the Murder of Col. F. M. Wishart in Robeson County, North Carolina—a Base and Treacherous Assassination." New York Times May 8, 1872, p. 3.
"The Lowrie Gang." New York Times 4 May 1874: p. 2, col. 3.

Selected primary sources
"Criminal Action Papers Concerning Henry Berry Lowrie." MS. North Carolina State Archives, Raleigh, NC. 1 box.
Gorman, John C. "Henry Berry Lowrie paper." Unpublished manuscript. ? Housed in the North Carolina Division of Archives and History, Raleigh, N.C. 26p.
"U.S. Cong. Joint Select Comm. to Inquire into the Condition of Affairs in the Late Insurrectionary States. Report… on the Condition of Affairs in the Late Insurrectionary States. Made to the Two Houses of Congress", 19 February 1872. 42nd Cong., 2nd Sess. Report No. 41, Part 1. 1872. Rpt. New York: AMS, 1968. See Vol. 2, pp. 283–304.

Books
Evans, W. McKee. TO DIE GAME: the story of the Lowrie Band, Indian guerillas of Reconstruction. Baton Rouge: Louisiana State UP, 1971.
Humphreys, Josephine, NOWHERE ELSE ON EARTH, Penguin Books, copyright 2000
Norment, Mary C. "THE LOWRIE HISTORY, As Acted in Part by Henry Berry Lowrie, the Great North Carolina Bandit. With Biographical Sketches of His Associates. Being a Complete History of the Modern Robber Band in the County of Robeson and State of North Carolina." Wilmington: Daily Journal Printer, 1875.
Thompson, R. Kaden. HENRY, This book loosely tell's a story of Henry and The Lowry Gang's life. Copyrighted under K.R. Publications 2020

External links
 The Center For Lumbee Studies
 Henry Berry Lowrie and the Lumbee on Fold3
 The Swamp Outlaws, 1872 book on Lowrie by George Alfred Townsend

1840s births
Activists from North Carolina
American outlaws
Lumbee people
Native American people from North Carolina
Native Americans in the American Civil War
People of North Carolina in the American Civil War
Tuscarora people
Year of death uncertain